is a Japanese manga artist.

He graduated from Wako University in Machida, Tokyo. In 1979, Nobe won an honorable mention in the 18th Tezuka Award for his story Hana to Arashi ga Iku.

Works
Listed alphabetically.
Monaco no Sora e, 22 volumes
Monaco no Sora e 2: Alas Kagayakeru Tsubasa, 5 volumes (as of July 2006)
Myū no Densetsu, 8 volumes
Nobe Toshio Senshū Tanpenshū, 2 volumes so far, short story collections
Nozomi Witches, 48 volumes, made into an OVA series from 1992–1993
Rising, 1 volume
Watashi no Okita-kun, 20 volumes
Yayoi no Ōzora, 11 volumes
Yōsei Taisen NOA, 9 volumes

External links

1957 births
Living people
Manga artists from Tochigi Prefecture
People from Utsunomiya, Tochigi